Berg is a village in the municipality of Sømna in Nordland county, Norway. The village of Trælnes lies just north of Berg (in Brønnøy). The village is home to some agricultural industries as well as a concrete factory.

About  of this urban area, with 19 residents, is located in the neighboring municipality of Brønnøy and the rest lies in the municipality of Sømna.

References

Villages in Nordland
Sømna